The Land grant to Marduk-apla-iddina kudurru is a grey limestone 0.7-meter tall ancient Mesopotamian narû or entitlement stele recording the gift of four tracts of cultivated land with settlements totaling 84 GUR 160 qa by Kassite king of Babylon, Meli-Šipak (ca. 1186–1172 BC ), to a person described as his servant (arassu irīm: “he granted his servant”) named Marduk-apla-iddina, who may be his son and/or successor or alternatively another homonymous individual. The large size of the grant together with the generous freedom from all territorial obligations (taxation, corvée, draft, foraging) has led historians to assume he was the prince. There are thirty six kudurrus which are placed on the basis of art-history to Meli-Šipak's reign, of which eight are specifically identified by his name. This is the best preserved of all of them.

The stele

The kudurru was recovered in 1899 from Susa, excavation reference Sb 22, by the French archaeological expedition under the auspices of Jacques de Morgan and brought to the Musée du Louvre where it still resides. The object is inscribed on three sides in seven columns and 387 lines. Like most kudurrus, it portrays Mesopotamian gods graphically in segmented registers on the stone. In this case the divine icons number twenty-four in five registers, rather more than usual.

The bequest was for communal land of the city of Agade located around the settlement of Tamakku adjacent to the royal canal in Bīt-Piri’-Amurru, a province in northern Babylonia. In a passage granting exemptions from service and taxation to the residents of the transferred territory, a list of officials are forbidden from appropriating the land and levying labor with restrictions placed on their conduct. This includes the king himself, the šakin māti (the governor of the land), and the pīḫātu (rank uncertain) of Bīt-Piri’-Amurru, contradicting the image of oriental despotism sometimes portrayed concerning the period.

The text concludes with an unusual series of blessings and curses including a rather gruesome curse of Gula, “may she place in his body her oozing (sores), a persistent carbuncle, of no release, so that, for as long as he lives, he may bathe in blood and pus like water!”, which seems to have been reproduced on the Stele of Meli-Šipak. There are no witnesses listed to validate the bequest, more evidence to suggest it was a gift between royalty.

The cast of characters
 Meli-Šipak, the king, donor
 Marduk-apal-iddina, his servant, beneficiary

The survey team:
 Ibni-Marduk, "son (=descendant) of Arad-Ea", presumably the šādid eqli, or field surveyor, as he appears as such on the land grant to Ḫasardu kudurru
 Šamaš-nādin-šumi, son of Arad-nubatti, ša rēš šarri (lúSAG LUGAL), a court official
 Šamaš-šum-līšir, son of Ultu-ilu, ḫazannu, or mayor, of Bīt-Pir’i-Amurru province

Divine symbols
The iconic representations of the gods, where they are known, are given in the sequence left-to-right, top-to-bottom:

Principal publications
  pl.  21–24 translation and photographs
  line art

See also

 Melišipak–(Meli-Shipak II)
 Kudurru

References

External links

 Louvre image sb22, and extensive write-up, and historical setting of Kassites (Louvre)
 Kudurru Image; Article-(English)
 Kudurru Image; Article
 Front Face/Reverse: The Cuneiform Text; Article-(in Spanish)
 Front Face-(color): Article(Spanish)
 High resolution of the "Kudurru of Melishihu"

Kassites
Kudurru boundary stones
Sculpture of the Ancient Near East
Near East and Middle East antiquities of the Louvre